Metabowerke GmbH with its headquarters in Nürtingen, Germany; Metabo is a manufacturer of power tools for professional users. The company was founded in the 1920s and got its name from  a hand drill, the so-called "Metallbohrdreher". Today, Metabo offers a wide range of power tools. The company is owned by the American investment firm Kohlberg Kravis Roberts & Co.

History 
In 1923, Albrecht Schnizler built his first hand drill in his parents' bakery in Nürtingen. 50,000 copies of this drill were sold under the designation No. 18 and one year later the Schnizler GmbH was founded. Co-founder Julius Closs was the owner of a brewery called “Sonnenbrauerei” in Nürtingen. The company moved into the rooms of this brewery located in Church Street. Walter Rauch became an associate in 1927 and managed the national and international distribution of the machines. In 1932, the company was renamed Metabowerke Closs, Rauch & Schnizler KG. The plant was spared serious damages during the war years, but in late autumn of 1945, a fire destroyed close to 75% of the manufacturing facilities. The reconstruction was completed in 1948.

The company's rapid growth made it necessary to move to a new headquarters. Therefore, in 1953, the construction of a new plant in Nürtingen's industrial zone Steinach was initiated. The relocation was completed in 1969 with a new administrative building.

In the course of restructuring measures, the Metabo group acquired Elektra Beckum in 1999, a company from Meppen in Northern Germany. Combined with the takeover of two other (woodworking) machine manufacturers, this briefly made Metabo the second largest producer of stationary woodworking machines in the world. However, in the next decade, they decided to focus mostly on producing smaller power tools. In 2004, Metabo restructured the production and a plant in Shanghai was established. The full integration of Elektra Beckum took place in 2006. In 2010, the disposal of the plant in Meppen marked the end of the restructuring process of the production plants.

March 1, 2016 Metabo was acquired by Hitachi Koki, part of Hitachi Group.

The Hitachi Group sold Hitachi Koki in March 2017 to HK Holdings Co., Ltd., an entity of the investment firm KKR.

The company today 
Metabo is a medium-sized company which focuses on the main target groups of metal craftsmen and industry along with building trade and renovation. Metabo manufactures in its factories in Nürtingen and Shanghai. Metabo works with 23 distribution companies and has over 100 importers.

Worldwide, Metabo has over 1,800 employees with a sales volume of 348 million Euro reported in 2013.

Products 
Essential/significant products and innovations, according to their own statements, are:
1934 – Metabo electric rotary drill No. 750 
1957 – Metabo Type 7608, world's first impact drill series is manufactured. 
1966 – Angle grinder with S-automatic safety clutch 
1969 – Impact drill with electronic speed regulation 
1981 – 1000 Watt impact drill with constant speed
2000 – Angle grinder with the Metabo Marathon-Motor
2002 – Compact cordless screwdriver "Power Grip®"
2005 – Introduction of lithium-ion battery technology into the cordless tool range.
2010 – Full Range of Stainless steel processing tools 
2011 – Cordless magnetic core drilling unit 
2012 – Battery pack with 4.0 Ah and Ultra-M-Technology. 
2013 – Battery pack with 5.2 Ah., Flat-head Angle Grinder
2014 – New Generation of Compact Angle Grinders from 900 - 1700 W 
2015 – LiHD Battery pack technology 

The company owns over 500 active patents and utility models.

A large number of the machines received the red dot design award.

Notes

External links
Metabo International Website
Metabo US website

Manufacturing companies established in 1924
German brands
Power tool manufacturers
Woodworking hand-held power tools
Hitachi
1924 establishments in Germany
Kohlberg Kravis Roberts companies
Tool manufacturing companies of Germany